The 70:20:10 Model for Learning and Development (also written as 70-20-10 or 70/20/10) is a learning and development model that suggests a proportional breakdown of how people learn effectively. It is based on a survey conducted in 1996 asking nearly 200 executives to self-report how they believed they learned.

In this survey respondents reported the following influences on learning:

 70% from challenging assignments
 20% from developmental relationships 
 10% from coursework and training 
Michael Lombardo and Robert Eichinger expressed their rationale behind the 70:20:10 model in the following way in The Career Architect Development Planner:

Development generally begins with a realization of current or future need and the motivation to do something about it. This might come from feedback, a mistake, watching other people’s reactions, failing or not being up to a task – in other words, from experience. The odds are that development will be about 70% from on-the-job experiences - working on tasks and problems; about 20% from feedback and working around good and bad examples of the need; and 10% from courses and reading.

Criticisms 

Criticisms of the hypothesis include:
 A lack of supporting empirical evidence. 
The use of perfectly even numbers.  
 The nature of the survey (i.e. Asking already successful managers to reflect on their experiences.) 
 The model may not reflect the changes in the market instigated by online technologies. For example, it does not reflect the recent focus on informal learning.
 The 70:20:10 model is not prescriptive. Author and learning & development professional Andy Jefferson asserts it "is neither a scientific fact nor a recipe for how best to develop people."
 Every business has its own optimization levers, and it will be imprudent to apply the 70:20:10 model to all businesses.

See also
 20% Project

References

Business models
Learning methods